In the parliamentary debates over the Kuwaiti minimum wage, MPs Askar Al-Enezi and Sadoon Al-Otaibi have dismissed past wage increases as “too small” and not enough to meet the steep hikes in consumer prices.

On February 21, 2008, the Kuwaiti Parliament approved a 120 dinar ($440) monthly pay rise for nationals in the public and private sectors after inflation hit 7.3%, a 16-year high.  It also decided to raise by 50 dinars ($184) the pay of foreigners employed by the government.  In response, Al-Enezi said, “We reject this increase because it is well below expectations. We urge the government to review its decision."

References

Politics of Kuwait
Law of Kuwait